Bapen (zhuang: Bahbwnz Yangh) is a Township under the administration of Fusui County in southern Guangxi Zhuang Autonomous Region, China. , it had an area of  populated by 27,552 people residing in 8 villages.

Administrative divisions
There are  8 villages:

Villages:
 Napo (那坡村), Gudou (姑豆村), Nabiao (弄廪村), Balun (岜伦村), Nongdong (弄洞村), Tuoliao (驮辽村), Nabiao (那标村), Bapen (岜盆村)

See also
List of township-level divisions of Guangxi

References

External links
 Bapen  Township/Official website of  Bapen 

Townships of Guangxi
Fusui County